Widgee is a rural locality in the Gympie Region, Queensland, Australia.

History
The name is believed to have originated from the Aboriginal words Witchee Witchee meaning listen or hark.

In 1887,  of land were resumed from the Widgee Widgee pastoral run. The land was offered for selection for the establishment of small farms on 17 April 1887.

Widgee Provisional School opened on 11 July 1892. It became Widgee State School on 1 January 1909.

On 10 August 1912 at the Lands Office at Gympie, the Queensland Government offered for selection 48 agricultural lots in the  Widgee Repurchased Estate.

Heritage listings
Widgee has a number of heritage-listed sites, including:
 Woolooga Road, Upper Widgee: Wodonga House

Education 
Widgee State School is a government primary (Prep-6) school for boys and girls at 2156 Gympie-Woolooga Road. In 2017, the school had an enrolment of 52 students with 4 teachers (3 full-time equivalent) and 6 non-teaching staff (3 full-time equivalent).

There are no secondary schools in Widgee; the nearest one is James Nash State High School in Gympie.

References

Further reading

External links

Community website

Gympie Region
Localities in Queensland